Cold Creek Correctional Facility (CCCF) was a Tennessee Department of Correction prison located in unincorporated Lauderdale County, Tennessee, near Henning. CCCC is now the West Tennessee State Penitentiary (WTSP) Site #1. The prison facility was previously named the West Tennessee High Security Facility and the Fort Pillow State Prison and Farm.

The Fort Pillow Prison and Farm originally opened in December 1937. As of July 13, 1998 the institution supported a  farming operation. In 1999 the Cold Creek Correctional Facility closed. CCCF was replaced by a medium security complex built next to the West Tennessee High Security Facility (WTHSF). The two complexes and the CCCF minimum security annex were operationally combined and became the WTSP.

Musician Steve Earle performed a concert at Cold Creek in June 1996 as part of a parole agreement after he was jailed for drug offenses the previous year.  The concert was filmed as a MTV special, To Hell and Back, which was later released on DVD as part of a box set in July 2013.

References

External links

 "Cold Creek Correctional Facility." Tennessee Department of Correction. (Archive)

Buildings and structures in Lauderdale County, Tennessee
Prisons in Tennessee
1999 disestablishments in Tennessee
1937 establishments in Tennessee